Doordarshan Uttar Pradesh often abbreviated as DD Uttar Pradesh (Hindi: दूरदर्शन उत्तर प्रदेश) is a 24-hour regional satellite TV channel primarily telecasting from Doordarshan Kendra Lucknow (DDK Lucknow) and is a part of the state-owned Doordarshan TV Network. Previously, it was known as DD-16 Uttar Pradesh.

It majorly serves the Indian state of Uttar Pradesh.

History
Lucknow Doordarshan started functioning on 27 Nov. 1975 with an interim setup at 22, Ashok Marg, Lucknow. The colour transmission service of National Channel (only with Transmitter) started from 15-8-82. While the regular colour transmission service from studio was started in 1984 with ENG gadgets.

See also
 List of programs broadcast by DD National
 All India Radio
 Ministry of Information and Broadcasting
 DD Direct Plus
 List of South Asian television channels by country

External links
 Doordarshan Official Internet site
 Doordarshan news site
 An article at PFC

References

Doordarshan
Foreign television channels broadcasting in the United Kingdom
Television channels and stations established in 1992
Indian direct broadcast satellite services
Mass media in Uttar Pradesh
Television channels based in Lucknow